William James Booth CVO (3 February 1939 – 2 June 2009) was an Anglican priest and priest vicar of Westminster Abbey who served as a chaplain to HM The Queen.

Early life
A descendant of Humphrey Booth of Dublin (see Gore-Booth), he was born in 1939 and educated at Ballymena Academy, County Antrim and Trinity College, Dublin, where he graduated Bachelor of Arts (1960) proceeding Master of Arts (1975).

Career
Booth was ordained a deacon of the Church of Ireland in 1962 and a priest in 1963. His first appointment was as curate in St Luke's Parish, Belfast, from 1962 to 1964. From 1965 to 1974 he was chaplain of Cranleigh School, Surrey, and from 1974 to 1991 he was chaplain of Westminster School.

Booth served as sub-dean of the Chapel Royal, Deputy Clerk of the Closet, subalmoner of the Royal Almonry and former domestic chaplain to Queen Elizabeth II, appointed in 1991, was the sole full-time member of the Ecclesiastical Household of the sovereign of the United Kingdom. Additional appointments included priest vicar of Westminster Abbey (1987–1993), and priest in ordinary to Queen Elizabeth (1976–1993).

Booth retired from the Chapel Royal in March 2007 after serving the Queen's household for 16 years. He was appointed CVO by the Queen on 5 March 2007. A reception to mark his retirement was held at Buckingham Palace on 26 March 2007.

Booth was acting chaplain of New College, Oxford from January to June 2009 as well as the club chaplain at the East India Club, London. He died at Oxford on 2 June 2009. His funeral took place at Queens Chapel (St James Palace, London) on 17 June 2009 and a memorial service was held at St Margaret's Chapel, Westminster, shortly afterwards.

References

External links
 www.burkespeerage.com
 www.telegraph.co.uk

2009 deaths
1939 births
People educated at Ballymena Academy
Alumni of Trinity College Dublin
20th-century Irish Anglican priests
Anglicans from Northern Ireland
Commanders of the Royal Victorian Order
Chaplains of New College, Oxford